Oleksandr Dovzhenko is a Ukrainian professional poker player. Dovzhenko plays professionally from late 90s. In 2009 he was second at European Poker Tour event in Kyiv. Winner of Mediterranean Poker Cup on Cyprus (2010), Russian Poker Tour finalist, also was at final table of  Casinos Austria Poker Tour in Baden (2010).

Third-place finisher at Partouche Poker Tour side event (2010). In January, 2011, Oleksandr was a captain of Ukrainian National Team in World Cup of Poker.

Appeared at second season of poker tv-show called "Russian Fight" at REN TV.

As of 2011, his total live tournament winnings exceed $1,000,000.

References 
 Tournament results at HendonMob 
 WSOP Profile 
 EPT Profile
 Poker.Ru Interview 
 Balaganoff.com video interview 
 Radio-broadcast interview on GipsyTeam 
 "WSOP Main Event-2010. All My Hands (article)" 
 "WPT World Championship-2011. All My Hands (article)" 
 World Cup of Poker-2011 final table coverage 
 European Poker Tour Kyiv final table, TV coverage

Ukrainian poker players
Living people
Year of birth missing (living people)